A mine is an explosive placed underground or underwater that explodes when disturbed, or when remotely triggered. The term originated from the use of mining to go under the enemy's city walls.

Mines, unlike bombs, are placed in situ and then require some other stimulus from a target before they will detonate.

 Land mine, mines on land
 Anti-personnel mine, a land mine targeting people on foot
 Anti-tank mine, a land mine against vehicles
 Naval mine or sea mine, a mine at sea, either floating or on the sea bed
 Captive torpedo, a sea mine which releases a torpedo on sensing a target
 Aerial mine or parachute mine, an air-dropped sea mine falling gently under a parachute, used as a high-capacity cheaply cased large bomb against ground targets
 Cluster bomb, an aerial bomb which releases a large number of small submunitions, which often act as mines.